Karindalam  is a village in Kasaragod district in the state of Kerala, India.

Demographics
As of 2011 Census, Karindalam had a population of 6,602 with 3,240 males and 3,362 females. Karindalam village had an average literacy of 90.13% higher than the national average of 74% and lower than state average of 94%.

Administration
This panchayat is administered as a part of the newly formed Vellarikundu taluk. Kinanoor-Karindalam Panchayat is a part of Kanhangad Assembly constituency under Kasaragod Loksabha constituency.

Transportation
The national highway passing through Nileshwaram connects to Mangalore in the north and Kannur in the south. The nearest railway station is Nileshwar on Mangalore-Palakkad line. There are airports at Mangalore and Kannur.

References

Nileshwaram area